The International Fritz Kreisler Competition is a violin competition dedicated to the memory of violinist and composer Fritz Kreisler.

Founded in 1979, it is carried out every four years in Vienna, Austria. It is limited to violinists of or under 30 years of age.  To avoid favoritism, the members of the jury may not enter their own students in the contest.

Required repertoire

Preliminaries
 J. S. Bach: the first two movements of a solo sonata, the first four movements of a partita, or the Ciaccona (of the Second Partita) 
 A caprice by Paganini, Wieniawski, or Ernst 
 F. Kreisler: Recitative and Scherzo-Caprice

Semifinal
G. Tartini: Devil's Trill Sonata with the Kreisler cadenza or 
F. Kreisler: Praeludium and Allegro or 
F. Kreisler: Variations on a Theme by Corelli 
A composition for violin and piano of the "Viennese school" from the 18th to the 20th century (Viennese classic, Brahms, R. Strauss, Schönberg, Webern, Krenek, etc.) 
A modern composition of the 20th century (violin/piano or violin solo) from a composer of the participant's home country 
A virtuoso composition of free choice (violin/piano or violin solo) 
One of Fritz Kreisler's short compositions or arrangements as an encore (e.g. Caprice Viennois, Tambourin Chinois, Liebesleid, Liebesfreud, Spanish Dance, Syncopation etc.)

Final
A violin concerto of the 19th or 20th century (the earliest accepted being Beethoven) with a Kreisler cadenza if possible

Most of these pieces must be played by memory.

Finalists, laureates and winners

External links 
http://www.fritzkreisler.com

References

Violin competitions